Sam Bisbee is an American independent film producer and composer. He is a co-winner of the Primetime Emmy Award for Exceptional Merit in Documentary Filmmaking in 2019, and in 2021 was nominated for a Peabody Award.

Biography 
Bisbee graduated from Columbia University in 1990. After graduating from college, he worked as a songwriter, composer, and music producer.

Bisbee has composed scores for movies, including the 2000 film Wildflowers and signed a publishing deal with Nettwerk in 2008. He also co-wrote the script and composed the score for movies Don't Go in the Woods, Mall, and produced The New Tenants, which won the Academy Award for Best Live Action Short Film in 2010.

Bisbee is a founding partner of Park Pictures Features, where he produced, and brought 13 films to premiere at the Sundance Film Festival, including the Alfred P. Sloan Prize-winning Robot & Frank and the Golden Globe-nominated Infinitely Polar Bear. His company won the 2019 Cannes Lions Palme d'Or, awarded to the top production company of the year and the company won a total of 19 awards at the festival.

He was nominated for the 2017 Independent Spirit Award for Best First Feature for co-producing the comedy-drama Other People. He is the brother of sculptor John Bisbee.

References

External links 

 

Living people
American producers
American composers
Emmy Award winners
American independent film production company founders
Columbia College (New York) alumni
American film producers
Year of birth missing (living people)